Bani Hanan and Al-Badou is a sub-district located in As Sawd District, 'Amran Governorate, Yemen. Bani Hanan and Al-Badou had a population of 4959 according to the 2004 census.

References 

Sub-districts in As Sawd District